The 2020 NAIA football season was the component of the 2020 college football season organized by the National Association of Intercollegiate Athletics (NAIA) in the United States. The regular season for many teams was moved to spring 2021 in light of the COVID-19 pandemic-related measures and protocols. The season's playoffs, known as the NAIA Football National Championship, culminated with the championship game on May 10, 2021, at Eddie Robinson Stadium in Grambling, Louisiana. It was originally scheduled for December 19, 2020.

Conference changes and new programs

Membership changes

Roosevelt acquired Robert Morris University's football team in April 2020 after merging with Robert Morris.

Conference standings

Postseason

Bracket

Rankings

See also
 2020 NCAA Division I FBS football season
 2020–21 NCAA Division I FCS football season
 2020–21 NCAA Division II football season
 2020–21 NCAA Division III football season

References